Acheilognathus peihoensis is a species of ray-finned fish in the genus Acheilognathus.

References

Acheilognathus
Fish described in 1910